Castlecraig, also known as Craig Castle and Castle Craig, is a 16th-century fortification located on the north shore of the Black Isle in northern Scotland. The castle is protected as a scheduled monument.

Castlecraig is a ruined tower house. The north-east wing still stands and remains roofed, although another wing to the north-west has collapsed. The tower may have been used as a residence by the post-Reformation Bishops of Ross.

The New Zealand geologic formation of Castle Craig Rock is named for its similar appearance to Castlecraig.

References

 

Castles in Highland (council area)
Scheduled monuments in Scotland
Black Isle
Tower houses in Scotland